World Series of Fighting Global Championship 3: Philippines was a mixed martial arts event held on July 30, 2016 at the Smart Araneta Coliseum in Quezon City, Philippines.

Background
The event was headlined by a fight between Evgeny Erokhin and Richard Odoms for the WSOF Global Heavyweight Championship.

Results

See also
List of WSOF champions
List of WSOF events

References

World Series of Fighting events
2016 in mixed martial arts
Sports in Metro Manila